Indian Trail may refer to:

 A part of or the whole of the Great Trail created by Native Americans
 Indian Trail, North Carolina
 Indian Trails, an intercity bus service provider in and around Michigan

See also
 Indian Trail School (disambiguation)
 Indian Trails Middle School (disambiguation)
 Indian Trails Council (disambiguation)